Barnsley is a market town in South Yorkshire, England.

Barnsley may also refer to:

Places 
in England
 Metropolitan Borough of Barnsley, a local government district in South Yorkshire
Barnsley (UK Parliament constituency), South Yorkshire
 Barnsley, Gloucestershire, a village
 Barnsley, Shropshire, a village
 Barnsley Manor, a manor house on the Isle of Wight
Elsewhere
 Barnsley, New South Wales, Australia
 Barnsley, Manitoba, Canada
 Barnsley, Kentucky, United States

People 
 Barnsley (surname)

Science 
Mathematics
 Barnsley fern, a fractal named after the British mathematician Michael Barnsley

Other
in South Yorkshire, England
 Barnsley Building Society
 Barnsley Canal
 Barnsley F.C., a professional football club 
 Barnsley (speedway), a speedway team